Maider Luengo Lasa (born 31 May 1980 in San Sebastián) is a Spanish former field hockey player who competed in the 2004 Summer Olympics.

References

External links
 

1980 births
Living people
Spanish female field hockey players
Female field hockey goalkeepers
Olympic field hockey players of Spain
Field hockey players at the 2004 Summer Olympics
Sportspeople from San Sebastián
Field hockey players from the Basque Country (autonomous community)